Until 1 January 2007 Ejby Municipality was a municipality (Danish, kommune) in Funen County on the north and west coasts  of the island of Funen in southern Denmark.  The municipality included the island of Brandsø, covered an area of 163 km2, and had a total population of 10,046 (2005). Its last mayor was Claus Hansen, a member of the Venstre (Liberal Party) political party. The main town and the site of its municipal council was the town of Ejby.

Ejby municipality ceased to exist as the result of Kommunalreformen ("The Municipality Reform" of 2007).  It was combined with existing Middelfart and Nørre Aaby municipalities to form an enlarged Middelfart Municipality.  This created a municipality with an area of 297 km2 and a total population of 36,113 (2005).  The municipality belongs to the Region of Southern Denmark.

Attractions
 Fun Park Fyn (Fyns Sommerland)
 Gelsted Marked
 Tybrind
 Wedellsborg

External links
 Middelfart municipality's official website

References 
 Municipal statistics: NetBorger Kommunefakta, delivered from KMD aka Kommunedata (Municipal Data)
 Municipal mergers and neighbors: Eniro new municipalities map

Former municipalities of Denmark